Nadine Khouzam (born 21 June 1990 in Anderlecht) is a Belgian field hockey player. At the 2012 Summer Olympics she competed with the Belgium women's national field hockey team in the women's tournament. In 2009 she won the Golden Stick from the Belgian Hockey Association in the category of female junior players.

Khouzam studied Computer Engineering at the Université Libre de Bruxelles and lives in Ixelles.

References

External links 
 

1990 births
Living people
Olympic field hockey players of Belgium
Belgian female field hockey players
Female field hockey goalkeepers
Field hockey players at the 2012 Summer Olympics
People from Anderlecht
Field hockey players from Brussels
21st-century Belgian women